Belle Rive is a village in Jefferson County, Illinois, United States. The population was 361 at the 2010 census. It is part of the Mount Vernon Micropolitan Statistical Area.

History
Grant was a wealthy land speculator from Montgomery County, Tennessee. At that time there was a corporation in Mt. Vernon that was attempting to build a rail line from St. Louis to Evansville, Indiana. It seems likely that Grant was buying land in anticipation of the construction of the railroad, intending to build a town. This early attempt at building a railroad failed during a recession in the mid-1850s. Grant died in 1863, after being chased from Mt. Vernon by a mob objecting to his Confederate politics.

Belle Rive was founded in 1871, coinciding with the opening of the St. Louis & Southeastern Railroad.

Belle Rive got its name from Louis Groston de Saint-Ange de Bellerive, who surrendered Illinois to the British in 1765. It is not clear if he was ever associated with the area near the village. See List of commandants of the Illinois Country.

Joseph Wall was one of the early settlers of Belle Rive. The Wall farm was to the southeast of the town. Joseph Wall was married to Edmund P. Grant's niece.

Belle Rive is home to the regionally renowned Wilkey's Cafe. Serving a homestyle buffet, Wilkey's is a popular lunch spot for local farmers.

Notable people: 
Chelsea Cross, born and raised 
Landon James, 2016 SIJHSAA Class S State Cross Country Champion

Geography
Belle Rive is located in southeastern Jefferson County. Illinois Route 142 passes through the village, leading northwest  to Mount Vernon, the county seat, and southeast  to McLeansboro.

The village is drained by tributaries of Auxier Creek, an east-flowing stream in the Little Wabash River watershed.

Demographics

As of the census of 2000, there were 371 people, 147 households, and 109 families residing in the village. The racial makeup of the village was 97.57% White, 0.54% African American, 0.81% Native American, and 1.08% from two or more races.

There were 147 households, out of which 29.3% had children under the age of 18 living with them, 66.7% were married couples living together, 4.8% had a female householder with no husband present, and 25.2% were non-families. 22.4% of all households were made up of individuals, and 15.6% had someone living alone who was 65 years of age or older.  The average household size was 2.52 and the average family size was 2.92.

In the village, the population was spread out, with 21.6% under the age of 18, 10.5% from 18 to 24, 23.2% from 25 to 44, 27.8% from 45 to 64, and 17.0% who were 65 years of age or older.  The median age was 41 years. For every 100 females, there were 95.3 males.  For every 100 females age 18 and over, there were 92.7 males.

The median income for a household in the village was $37,292, and the median income for a family was $41,719. Males had a median income of $28,438 versus $18,036 for females. The per capita income for the village was $15,221.  About 10.3% of families and 13.8% of the population were below the poverty line, including 22.4% of those under age 18 and 9.0% of those age 65 or over.

See also

 List of municipalities in Illinois

References

External links

 History of Belle Rive
 History of Jefferson County
 Illinois Land Sales

Villages in Jefferson County, Illinois
Villages in Illinois
Mount Vernon, Illinois micropolitan area
Populated places established in 1871
1871 establishments in Illinois